Mid Vermont Christian School (MVCS) is a Christian PK-12 school in Quechee, Hartford, Vermont. It has a White River Junction postal address.

In 1999 Cassie Horner of The Windsor Chronicle described the school as "intentionally non-denominational".

In 2005 Jessica T. Lee of the Valley News described the school as "tight-knit".

History
Circa 1986, a group backed by four families began renting the Woodstock Baptist Church grange hall to hold Christian day school classes.

The school opened in 1987. The initial enrollment was five. In 1991 people supporting the school spent $600,000 to acquire a three story building in order to house the classes. The building previously included a bar and a restaurant, and the supporters of the school spent $200,000 to transform it into a school building. A gymnasium was added, and the cost to build that was $450,000. In 1993 the student count was 111.

Operations
In 1993 class sizes were typically 15.

Curriculum
In 1999 the curriculum followed the standards of the State of Vermont and used state and Christian-oriented texts.

, each week a 45-minute chapel was obligatory per student, and on a daily basis one hour was used to have classes on the Bible.

Student body
In 1999 the student body originated from about 30 churches.

Athletics
In 2023 the girls' basketball team was assigned to play a team with a player who is a transgender girl. The school's team forfeited the match due to “fairness and safety concerns”. As a result the Vermont Principals' Association (VPA) forbade the school from competition.

References

External links
 Mid Vermont Christian School

Nondenominational Christian schools in the United States
Private elementary schools in Vermont
Private middle schools in Vermont
Private high schools in Vermont
Private K-12 schools in the United States
Buildings and structures in Hartford, Vermont
1987 establishments in Vermont
Educational institutions established in 1987
Schools in Windsor County, Vermont